The Louisville and Nashville Passenger Station was a former train station of the Louisville and Nashville Railroad in New Orleans, Louisiana. The station was located at the foot of Canal Street, and provided service to New Orleans from Birmingham, Montgomery, and Mobile. By the 1940s, six passenger trains arrived daily on the terminal's three tracks.

The station was demolished in early 1954 after all passenger service was relocated to the new Union Passenger Terminal.

Design

The one story brick building constructed in 1902 with a  concourse that paralleled the main building. The station contained the following rooms:

 general waiting room (30 ft wide and 45 ft long) 
 colored waiting room (25 ft wide and 35 ft long) 
 two small rest rooms
 one baggage room (30 ft wide and 60 ft long)

Mail and express packages were handled direct from the cars to trucks.

References

Transportation buildings and structures in New Orleans
Railway stations in the United States opened in 1902
Railway stations closed in 1954
New Orleans
Demolished railway stations in the United States
Former railway stations in Louisiana